Yelena Aleksandrovna Panova (born 2 March 1987) is a female discus thrower from Russia. She competed in the Women's discus throw event at the 2015 World Championships in Athletics in Beijing, China.

See also
 Russia at the 2015 World Championships in Athletics

References

External links 

Living people
1987 births
Place of birth missing (living people)
Russian female discus throwers
World Athletics Championships athletes for Russia
Russian Athletics Championships winners
Universiade medalists in athletics (track and field)
Universiade silver medalists for Russia